The 2023 NRL season is the 116th season of professional rugby league in Australia and the 26th season run by the National Rugby League.

Teams 
For the 2023 season, the number of teams in the NRL has increased from sixteen to seventeen with the inclusion of a fourth Queensland-based club, the Dolphins, based at Redcliffe. It is the first time the number of Premiership teams has changed since 2007 when the Gold Coast Titans joined the competition.

Collective bargaining agreement issues
The start of the season was overshadowed by ongoing issues between the NRL and the Rugby League Players Association (RLPA). By February 2023, the RLPA and the NRL were at a stalemate following the expiration of the previous collective bargaining agreement in November 2022.

The NRL had announced an increased salary cap on 23 December 2022, surprising the RLPA who had yet to agree to terms with the NRL.

By February 2023, the possibility of a player's strike or other industrial action had yet to be ruled out by the RLPA.

Pre-season

Pre-season matches were played between 4 February and 19 February 2023, before a 11-day lead up until the beginning of the regular season.

Regular season

Results
 

 
Bold – Home game
X – Bye
* – Golden point game
Opponent for round listed above margin

Ladder

Ladder progression

Numbers highlighted in green indicate that the team finished the round inside the top eight.
Numbers highlighted in blue indicates the team finished first on the ladder in that round.
Numbers highlighted in red indicates the team finished last place on the ladder in that round.
Underlined numbers indicate that the team had a bye during that round.

Attendances

Club figures

Top attendances

Transfers
Source:

Players

References 

 
Rugby league in Australia
NRL